Gammaridea is one of the suborders of the order Amphipoda, comprising small, shrimp-like crustaceans. Until recently, in a traditional classification, it encompassed about 7,275 (92%) of the 7,900 species of amphipods described by then, in approximately 1,000 genera, divided among around 125 families. That concept of Gammaridea included almost all freshwater amphipods, while most of the members still were marine.

The group is however considered paraphyletic, and is under deconstruction by the amphipod taxonomists J. Lowry  and A. Myers.  In 2003 they moved several families from Gammaridea to join members of the former  Caprellidea in a new suborder Corophiidea.  Further, in 2013 another large suborder Senticaudata was established, which now encompasses much of the original Gammaridea, particularly its freshwater families, and into which also the Corophiidea was merged.
The remaining Gammaridea encompasses 85 families and about 4,000 of the ca. 9,550 amphipod species recognized in 2014. The family Gammaridae does not belong to Gammaridea in this new system.

Families
This list comprises those families that remain in the suborder Gammaridea after the separation of the Senticaudata, as listed in WoRMS (April 2014):

Superfamily Eusiroidea Bousfield, 1979 
Eusiridae Stebbing, 1888
Superfamily Liljeborgioidea Stebbing, 1899
Liljeborgiidae Stebbing, 1899
Superfamily Lysianassoidea Dana, 1849
Acidostomatidae Stoddart & Lowry, 2012
Amaryllididae Lowry & Stoddart, 2002
Aristiidae Lowry & Stoddart, 1997
Cebocaridae Lowry & Stoddart, 2011
Cyclocaridae Lowry & Stoddart, 2011
Cyphocarididae Lowry & Stoddart, 1997
Endevouridae Lowry & Stoddart, 1997
Eurytheneidae Stoddart & Lowry, 2004
Hirondelleidae Lowry & Stoddart, 2010
Izinkalidae Lowry & Stoddart, 2010
Kergueleniidae Lowry & Stoddart, 2010
Lepidepecreellidae Stoddart & Lowry, 2010
Lysianassidae Dana, 1849
Opisidae Lowry & Stoddart, 1995
Pachynidae Lowry & Stoddart, 2012
Podoprionidae Lowry & Stoddart, 1996
Scopelocheiridae Lowry & Stoddart, 1997
Sophrosynidae Lowry & Stoddart, 2010
Thoriellidae Lowry & Stoddart, 2011
Trischizostomatidae Lilljeborg, 1865
Uristidae Hurley, 1963
Wandinidae Lowry & Stoddart, 1990
Lysianassoidea incertae sedis
Superfamily Pontoporeioidea Dana, 1853
Pontoporeiidae Dana, 1853
Priscillinidae d'Udekem d'Acoz, 2006
Families not attributed to superfamilies:
Acanthonotozomatidae Stebbing, 1906
Acanthonotozomellidae Coleman & Barnard, 1991
Alicellidae Lowry & De Broyer, 2008
Amathillopsidae Pirlot, 1934
Ampeliscidae Krøyer, 1842
Amphilochidae Boeck, 1871
Argissidae Walker, 1904
Astyridae Pirlot, 1934
Atylidae Lilljeborg, 1865
Bateidae Stebbing, 1906
Bolttsiidae Barnard & Karaman, 1987
Cheidae Thurston, 1982
Cheluridae Allman, 1847
Colomastigidae Stebbing, 1899
Condukiidae Barnard & Drummond, 1982
Cressidae Stebbing, 1899
Cyproideidae J.L. Barnard, 1974
Dexaminidae Leach, 1814
Didymocheliidae Bellan-Santini & Ledoyer, 1987
Dikwidae Coleman & Barnard, 1991
Epimeriidae Boeck, 1871
Exoedicerotidae Barnard & Drummond, 1982
Haustoriidae Stebbing, 1906
Hyperiopsidae Bovallius, 1886
Ipanemidae Barnard & Thomas, 1988
Iphimediidae Boeck, 1871
Lafystiidae Sars, 1893
Laphystiopsidae Stebbing, 1899
Lepechinellidae Schellenberg, 1926
Leucothoidae Dana, 1852
Maxillipiidae Ledoyer, 1973
Megaluropidae Thomas & Barnard, 1986
Melphidippidae Stebbing, 1899
Miramarassidae Lowry, 2006
Nihotungidae J.L. Barnard, 1972
Ochlesidae Stebbing, 1910
Oedicerotidae Lilljeborg, 1865
Pagetinidae K.H. Barnard, 1931
Paracalliopiidae Barnard & Karaman, 1982
Pardaliscidae Boeck, 1871
Phoxocephalidae Sars, 1891
Phoxocephalopsidae Barnard & Drummond, 1982
Platyischnopidae Barnard & Drummond, 1979
Pleustidae Buchholz, 1874
Podosiridae Lowry & Myers, 2012
Pseudamphilochidae Schellenberg, 1931
Sebidae Walker, 1908
Sicafodiidae Just, 2004
Stegocephalidae Dana, 1855
Stenothoidae Boeck, 1871
Stilipedidae Holmes, 1908
Synopiidae Dana, 1853
Thurstonellidae Lowry & Zeidler, 2008
Urohaustoriidae Barnard & Drummond, 1982
Urothoidae Bousfield, 1978
Valettiidae Stebbing, 1888
Valettiopsidae Lowry & De Broyer, 2008
Vicmusiidae Just, 1990
Vitjazianidae Birstein & M. Vinogradov, 1955
Zobrachoidae Barnard & Drummond, 1982

Gammaridea sensu lato
This alternative listing of families (divided to superfamilies) reflects the composition of the Gammaridea before the revision in 2013, when much of its contents were removed to a new suborder Senticaudata.

Superfamily Ampeliscoidea
Ampeliscidae
Superfamily Crangonyctoidea
Allocrangonyctidae
Artesiidae
Bogidiellidae
Crangonyctidae
Crymostygidae
Falklandellidae
Kotumsaridae (tentatively placed here)
Neoniphargidae
Niphargidae
Paracrangonyctidae
Paramelitidae
Perthiidae
Phreatogammaridae
Pseudocrangonyctidae
Pseudoniphargidae
Sternophysingidae
Superfamily Dexaminoidea
Atylidae
Dexaminidae
Lepechinellidae
Superfamily Eusiroidea
Amathillopsidae
Bateidae
Calliopiidae
Eusiridae
Gammaracanthidae
Gammarellidae
Pontogeneiidae
Superfamily Gammaroidea
Acanthogammaridae
Acanthonotozomatidae
Anisogammaridae
Baikalogammaridae
Behningiellidae
Cardenioidae
Caspicolidae
Eulimnogammaridae
Gammaridae
Gammaroporeiidae
Iphigenellidae
Macrohectopidae
Mesogammaridae
Micruropodidae
Pachyschesidae
Pallaseidae
Pontogammaridae
Typhlogammaridae
Superfamily Hadzioidea
Carangoliopsidae
Hadziidae
Melitidae
Metacrangonyctidae
Superfamily Iphimedioidea
Acanthonotozomellidae
Dikwidae
Epimeriidae
Iphimediidae
Ochlesidae
Vicmusiidae
Superfamily Kurioidea
Kuriidae
Superfamily Leucothoidea
Anamixidae
Leucothoidae
Pleustidae
Superfamily Liljborgioidea
Colomastigidae
Liljeborgiidae
Salentinellidae
Sebidae
Superfamily Lysianassoidea
Amaryllididae
Aristiidae
Cyphocarididae
Endevouridae
Eurytheneidae
Lysianassidae
Opisidae
Podoprionidae
Scopelocheiridae
Trischizostomatidae
Uristidae
Wandinidae
Superfamily Melphidippoidea
Megaluropidae
Melphidippidae
Superfamily Oedicerotoidea
Exoedicerotidae
Oedicerotidae
Paracalliopiidae
Superfamily Pardaliscoidea
Astyridae
Hyperiopsidae
Pardaliscidae
Sicafodiidae
Stilipedidae
Vitjazianidae
Superfamily Phoxocephaloidea
Cheidae
Condukiidae
Haustoriidae
Ipanemidae
Phoxocephalidae
Phoxocephalopsidae
Platyischnopidae
Pontoporeiidae
Sinurothoidae
Urohaustoriidae
Urothoidae
Zobrachoidae
Superfamily Stegocephaloidea
Stegocephalidae
Superfamily Stenothoidea
Amphilochidae
Bolttsiidae
Cyproideidae
Pseudamphilochidae
Stenothoidae
Superfamily Synopioidea
Argissidae
Synopiidae
Superfamily Talitroidea (includes Phliantoidea)
Biancolinidae
Ceinidae
Chiltoniidae
Dogielinotidae
Eophliantidae
Phliantidae
Plioplateiidae
Talitridae
Temnophliantidae
Superfamily Thurstonelloidea (formerly Clarencioidea)
Thurstonellidae (formerly Clarenciidae)
Incertae sedis
Cressidae
Didymocheliidae
Iciliidae
Lafystiidae
Laphystiopsidae
Maxillipiidae
Nihotungidae
Pagetinidae
Paraleptamphopidae
Tulearidae
Valettidae

References

External links

 
Amphipoda
Arthropod suborders